is a 2006 Japanese film by director Hitoshi Yazaki. The film, based on the Japanese manga of the same name by Kiriko Nananan, concerns the life of four girls, as they deal with their own insecurities while living in the metropolis of Tokyo. This movie ranked 7th Best Film at the 2006 Yokohama Film Festival and got Best Supporting Actress and Best Cinematography prizes from the same festival.

Plot
The plot revolves around four ladies struggling to find happiness in the capital city of Tokyo: Satoko, who works as a receptionist at an escort service called “Heaven’s Gate" and often prays to God to help her find a boy that will love her; Akiyo, who works at “Heaven’s Gate” as a call girl and is infatuated with Kikuchi, an old school friend, who she gladly changes her appearance for; Chihiro, who works in a low-level office position and often involves herself with men who only use her for sex; and Toko, Chihiro's roommate who works obsessively as an illustrator and suffers from bulimia, which she hides from everyone.

Cast
 Satoko – Chizuru Ikewaki
 Chihiro – Noriko Nakagoshi
 Akiyo – Yuko Nakamura
 Toko Iwase – Kiriko Nananan (the original comic writer)
 Nagai – Ryō Kase
 Kikuchi – Masanobu Andō

Awards
 Best Supporting Actress: Yûko Nakamura, 2006 – Yokohama Film Festival
 Best Cinematography: Isao Ishii, 2006 – Yokohama Film Festival

References

External links
  
 

 
2006 drama films
2006 films
Live-action films based on manga
Films set in Japan
Japanese drama films
2000s Japanese-language films
Films about prostitution in Japan
2000s Japanese films

ja:Strawberry shortcakes#映画